Hemidactylus paaragowli, also known as the Travancore rock gecko, is a species of large rock-dwelling gecko endemic to Southern Western Ghats of India.

References

Hemidactylus
Reptiles described in 2018
Reptiles of India
Endemic fauna of India